Leland William Frederick Stark (September 5, 1907 – May 8, 1986) was sixth bishop of the Episcopal Diocese of Newark, serving from 1958 to 1974.

Early life and education
Stark was born on September 5, 1907, in Evanston, Illinois, the son of the Reverend Gustav Knute Stark and Jennie Virginia Peterson. He was reared as a Lutheran however as he grew up he became an agnostic. He studied at the University of Minnesota and Gustavus Adolphus College from where he graduated with a Bachelor of Arts in 1932. While at Gustavus Adolphus he rekindled the faith and did some reaching in the Lutheran Church during his junior and senior year. He studied at Chicago Theological Seminary after which he continued his studies at Seabury-Western Theological Seminary and graduated with a Bachelor of Theology in 1935 and was awarded a Doctor of Divinity in 1953.

Priest
Stark was ordained deacon on June 18, 1935 by Bishop Frank McElwain of Minnesota and priest on December 18, 1935 by Bishop Stephen Keeler, Coadjutor of Minnesota. From 1935 to 1940 he served in a number of parishes in Minnesota until being appointed Dean of Calvary Cathedral in Sioux Falls, South Dakota in 1940. On October 10, 1948, he became rector of the Church of the Epiphany in Washington, D.C. In 1952 he served as deputy to the General Convention.

Bishop
Stark was elected Coadjutor Bishop of Newark in 1953 and was consecrated on June 9 by Presiding Bishop Henry Knox Sherrill in Trinity Cathedral, Newark, New Jersey. He succeeded as diocesan in 1958. As bishop he was involved in international peace committees and hence had to travel to countries in Africa and to Vietnam.

In 1967, Stark was involved in a controversy with the Governor of New Jersey Richard J. Hughes for letting a national four day black power conference to take place in the Cathedral house of the diocese. He retired in 1973 and moved to Verona, New Jersey. He died on May 8, 1986, in Mountainside Hospital in Montclair, New Jersey.

Family
Stark was married to Phyllis Anderson and together had two sons.

References

External links 
New York Times obituary
Retired Bishops Stark And Hogg Die

1907 births
1986 deaths
Converts to Anglicanism from Lutheranism
Converts to Anglicanism from atheism or agnosticism
People from Evanston, Illinois
University of Minnesota alumni
Gustavus Adolphus College alumni
Chicago Theological Seminary alumni
Seabury-Western Theological Seminary alumni
20th-century American Episcopalians
Episcopal bishops of Newark